= Africa Media Matrix =

Coordinates: 33°18′55″S 26°30′48″E

The Africa Media Matrix is the headquarters of Rhodes University's School of Journalism and Media Studies in Grahamstown in the Eastern Cape Province of South Africa.

Construction of the building began in 2001 at a cost of R24 million through a grant from the Ford Foundation and was completed in 2006.
